Alexei Borisovich Venkov (Алексей Борисович Венков, born 1946) is a Russian mathematician, specializing in the spectral theory of automorphic forms.

Venkov graduated from Leningrad State University in 1969 and received there in 1973 his Russian candidate degree (Ph.D.) under Ludvig Faddeev. He then became an academic at the Steklov Institute in Saint Petersburg, where he received in 1980 his Russian doctorate (higher doctoral degree) with dissertation Spectral theory of automorphic functions (Russian). He was a visiting scholar at IHES, at the University of Göttingen, in Paris (University of Paris VI, École Normale Superieure, Institute Henri Poincaré), at the MSRI, at Stanford University, several times at the Max Planck Institute for Mathematics in Bonn, at the University of Lille, and at the Aarhus University. Since 2001 he has been a lecturer at Aarhus University.

Venkov's research deals with the spectral theory of automorphic forms and their applications in number theory and mathematical physics. He has proved partial results for the Roelcke-Selberg conjecture.

In 1983 he was an Invited Speaker at the ICM in Warsaw. In 2006 he received the Humboldt Research Award.

Selected publications

Articles
with V. L. Kalinin and Ludvig Faddeev: A nonarithmetic derivation of the Selberg trace formula, Journal of Soviet Mathematics, vol. 8, 1977, pp. 171–199
Spectral theory of automorphic functions, the Selberg zeta-function, and some problems of analytic number theory and mathematical physics, Russian Mathematical Surveys, vol. 34, 1979, pp. 79–153
 Remainder term in the Weyl-Selberg asymptotic formula, Journal of Mathematical Sciences 17, no. 5, 1981, pp. 2083–2097 
with N. V. Proskurin: Automorphic forms and Kummer's problem, Russian Mathematical Surveys, vol. 37, 1982, pp. 165–190
Selberg's trace formula for an automorphic Schroedinger Operator, Functional Analysis and Applications, vol. 25, 1991, pp. 102–111 
On a multidimensional variant of the Roelcke-Selberg conjecture, Saint Petersburg Mathematical Journal, vol. 4, 1993, pp. 527–538
with A. M. Nikitin: The Selberg trace formula, Ramanujan graphs and some problems in mathematical physics,  Saint Petersburg Mathematical Journal, vol. 5, 1994, pp. 419–484.
Approximation of Maass forms by analytic modular forms, Saint Petersburg Mathematical Journal, vol. 6, 1995, pp. 1167–1177
The Zagier formula with the Eisenstein-Maass series at odd integer points, and the generalized Selberg zeta function, Saint Petersburg Mathematical Journal, vol. 6, 1995, pp. 519–527.
with E. Balslev: Selberg's eigenvalue conjecture and the Siegel zeros for Hecke L-series, in: Analysis on Homogeneous Spaces and Representation Theory of Lie Groups, Okayama-Kyoto 1997, Advanced Studies in Pure Mathematics 26, Mathematical Society of Japan 2000, pp. 19–32
with Erik Balslev: Spectral theory of Laplacians for Hecke groups with primitive character, Acta Mathematica, vol. 186, 2001, pp. 155–217, ; Correction vol. 192, 2004, pp. 1–3 
with E. Balslev: On the relative distribution of eigenvalues of exceptional Hecke operators and automorphic Laplacians, Original publication: Algebra i Analiz, tom 17 (2005), nomer 1. Journal: St. Petersburg Math. J. 17 (2006), 1-37 
with A. Momeni: Mayer's transfer operator approach to Selberg's zeta function, Original publication: Algebra i Analiz, tom 24 (2012), nomer 4. Journal: St. Petersburg Math. J. 24 (2013), 529–553 
with D. Mayer and A. Momeni: Congruence properties of induced representations and their applications, Original publication: Algebra i Analiz, tom 26 (2014), nomer 4. Journal: St. Petersburg Math. J. 26 (2015), 593–606

Books
Spectral theory of automorphic functions, American Mathematical Society 1983
Spectral theory of automorphic functions and its applications, Kluwer 1990;

References

External links
Alexei Venkov, Centre for Quantum Geometry for Moduli Spaces, Aarhus University
Venkov Aleksei Borisovich, mathnet.ru

Soviet mathematicians
Russian mathematicians
Saint Petersburg State University alumni
Academic staff of Aarhus University
1946 births
Living people